Tang-e Esmail (also Romanized as Tang-e Esmā‘īl; also known as Esmā‘īlābād) is a village in Qaleh Shahin Rural District, in the Central District of Sarpol-e Zahab County, Kermanshah Province, Iran. At the 2006 census, its population was 400, in 89 families.

References 

Populated places in Sarpol-e Zahab County